Newberg Public Library is a public library system that serves the city of Newberg, Oregon, United States serving a population 25,138 as of 2020.

History
The Newberg Public Library was established in downtown Newberg in 1908. The city was granted the funds for a "Carnegie Library" from Andrew Carnegie in 1912 and this building is still used today with an addition built on in 1986.

Services
The Library provides residents of the Chehalem Valley with access to a variety of resources. The Library has been in downtown Newberg since 1908. Today the Library has expanded from simply providing books, to becoming the information resource for the community.

The Newberg Public Library is a member of the Chemeketa Cooperative Regional Library Service.

Notes

External links 
Newberg Public Library

 Library buildings completed in 1912
 Carnegie libraries in Oregon
 Public libraries in Oregon
 Buildings and structures in Newberg, Oregon
 Education in Yamhill County, Oregon
1908 establishments in Oregon
 Libraries established in 1908